Ramil Omar Sheriff (born 26 December 1993) is a footballer who plays as a centre-back or midfielder. He made one appearance for the Jamaica national team in 2014

Club career
Sheriff began his career in the youth teams at Arsenal and Tottenham Hotspur. He secured a contract with Norwich City in 2012. He was appointed captain of the U21 side and played 19 times in the Professional Development League in 2012–13. However, his contract concluded in June 2013 and he was released by the club.

In 2013–14, Sheriff played for Cockfosters and Northwood before moving onto Harrow Borough and Haringey Borough for the 2014–15 season.

Sheriff played for Belgian Third Division B side Woluwe-Zaventem in the 2015–16 season. He re-joined Haringey Borough for 2016–17.

International career
Sheriff was capped by Jamaica at U-20 level. He made his debut for the senior side on 8 June 2014 in an 8–0 away friendly loss against France, coming on as a 65th-minute substitute for Chris Humphrey.

References

External links
 
 

1993 births
Living people
Footballers from Greater London
English footballers
Jamaican footballers
Jamaica international footballers
Association football defenders
Arsenal F.C. players
Tottenham Hotspur F.C. players
Norwich City F.C. players
Cockfosters F.C. players
Northwood F.C. players
Harrow Borough F.C. players
Haringey Borough F.C. players
K.V. Woluwe-Zaventem players
Southern Football League players
Isthmian League players
Expatriate footballers in Belgium
English people of Jamaican descent
Black British sportspeople